Joseph Patrick Gone is an American psychologist. He is a professor of Anthropology and of Global Health and Social Medicine at Harvard University. In 2021, Gone was elected a member of the National Academy of Medicine "for being a leading figure among Native American mental health researchers whose work on cultural psychology, historical trauma, Indigenous healing, and contextual factors affecting mental health assessment and treatment has been highly influential and widely recognized."

Early life and education
Gone was raised in Kalispell, Montana with his adoptive mother as a member of the Gros Ventre tribe. Following high school, he enrolled at Oral Roberts University in Oklahoma before joining the United States Army. While serving in the military, Gone met several officers who recommended he attend the United States Military Academy, West Point. He attended West Point before transferring to Harvard University for his undergraduate degree in psychology. Upon completing his degree, Gone spent a year working on the Fort Belknap Indian Reservation with his biological family while applying to graduate school.

During his time on the reservation, Gone wrote health compliance procedures and administrative policies, worked in the vocational education program, and provided academic and career counseling for tribal college students. He eventually earned his PhD in clinical-community psychology at the University of Illinois Urbana-Champaign in 2001. During his graduate training, he served as the Charles A. Eastman Dissertation Fellow at Dartmouth College. His thesis was titled "Affect and its disorders in a Northern Plains Indian community: issues in cross-cultural discourse and diagnosis."

Career
Upon completing his PhD, Gone joined the faculty at the University of Michigan. In 2014, Gone was awarded a Guggenheim Fellowship to continue his advocacy on integrating indigenous healing practices into clinical mental health practices. He also used the fellowship to write his book "Rethinking American Indian Mental Health." The following year, he was named a fellow of the Association for Psychological Science.

In 2019, Gone left the University of Michigan to become a professor of global health and social medicine in the Blavatnik Institute at Harvard Medical School and faculty director of the Harvard University Native American Program (HUNAP). In 2021, Gone was elected a member of the National Academy of Medicine "for being a leading figure among Native American mental health researchers whose work on cultural psychology, historical trauma, Indigenous healing, and contextual factors affecting mental health assessment and treatment has been highly influential and widely recognized."

Personal life
Gone is married to Tiya Miles, a fellow academic.

References

External links

Living people
University of Illinois Urbana-Champaign alumni
Harvard College alumni
Harvard Medical School faculty
University of Michigan faculty
Members of the National Academy of Medicine
Native American academics
Native American scientists
21st-century American psychologists
Year of birth missing (living people)
American adoptees
Academics from Montana
Scientists from Montana
People from Kalispell, Montana